The Pac-12 Conference Softball Defensive Player of the Year is a college softball award given to the Pac-12 Conference's most outstanding defensive player. The award has been given annually since 2005. The conference was known as the Pacific-10 before becoming the Pac-12 in 2011.

Winners

Winners by school

References

Awards established in 2005
Defensive
College softball conference trophies and awards in the United States